"Weekends" is a song recorded by American group Black Eyed Peas for their second studio album Bridging the Gap (2000). It features vocals from Canadian singer Esthero. The song was released as the second single from Bridging the Gap on August 29, 2000, by Interscope Records. A modest commercial success, it peaked at number 73 on the US Hot R&B/Hip-Hop Songs.

Background
A remix of the song was featured on the deluxe edition of the group's fifth studio album, The E.N.D. The song samples the intro of "Family Affair" by Sly & the Family Stone, while the intro samples "Lord of the Golden Baboon" by Mandrill. The song's chorus is an interpolation of the chorus to Debbie Deb's "Lookout Weekend". This was the last single they released before Kim Hill left the group.

Music video
The video starts with members of the band at a work place. and continues by showing the band leaving. Arriving home, they start planning what they are going to do at the weekend. This is later followed by scenes of the band at a party. Cameos in the video include Esthero, Blood of Abraham and Kim Hill.

Track listings and formats
 Australian maxi CD single
 "Weekends" – 4:47
 "Empire Strikes Black" – 3:53
 "Magic" – 3:58
 "Joints & Jam" (The Billion Mix) – 3:23
 "Weekends" (live) – 5:43
 "BEP Empire" (music video)

 European maxi CD single
 "Weekends" – 4:47
 "Empire Strikes Black" – 3:53
 "Magic" – 3:58
 "BEP Empire" (music video)

Charts

Release history

References

2000 singles
Black Eyed Peas songs
Interscope Records singles
2000 songs
Songs written by will.i.am
Song recordings produced by will.i.am
Songs written by Taboo (rapper)
Songs written by apl.de.ap
Esthero songs
Funk songs
Alternative hip hop songs